Temal is a former municipality in the Shkodër County, northwestern Albania. At the 2015 local government reform it became a subdivision of the municipality Vau i Dejës. The population at the 2011 census was 1,562.

Notable people
Martin Camaj, linguist and professor of Albanology at the University of Munich.

References

Former municipalities in Shkodër County
Administrative units of Vau i Dejës